In physics, the energy–momentum relation, or relativistic dispersion relation, is the relativistic equation relating total energy (which is also called relativistic energy) to invariant mass (which is also called rest mass) and momentum. It is the extension of mass–energy equivalence for bodies or systems with non-zero momentum. It can be written as the following equation:
 
This equation holds for a body or system, such as one or more particles, with total energy , invariant mass , and momentum of magnitude ; the constant  is the speed of light. It assumes the special relativity case of flat spacetime and that the particles are free. Total energy is the sum of rest energy and kinetic energy, while invariant mass is mass measured in a center-of-momentum frame. 

For bodies or systems with zero momentum, it simplifies to the mass–energy equation , where total energy in this case is equal to rest energy (also written as ).

The Dirac sea model, which was used to predict the existence of antimatter, is closely related to the energy–momentum relation.

Connection to  

The energy–momentum relation is consistent with the familiar mass–energy relation in both its interpretations:  relates total energy  to the (total) relativistic mass  (alternatively denoted  or  ), while  relates rest energy  to (invariant) rest mass . 

Unlike either of those equations, the energy–momentum equation relates the total energy to the rest mass . All three equations hold true simultaneously.

Special cases 

For photons, this is the relation, discovered in 19th century classical electromagnetism, between radiant momentum (causing radiation pressure) and radiant energy.

A more general form of relation holds for general relativity.

The invariant mass (or rest mass) is an invariant for all frames of reference (hence the name), not just in inertial frames in flat spacetime, but also accelerated frames traveling through curved spacetime (see below). Although we still have, in flat spacetime:

The relation allows one to sidestep Lorentz transformations when determining only the magnitudes of the energy and momenta by equating the relations in the different frames. Again in flat spacetime, this translates to;

In relativistic quantum mechanics, it is the basis for constructing relativistic wave equations, since if the relativistic wave equation describing the particle is consistent with this equation – it is consistent with relativistic mechanics, and is Lorentz invariant. In relativistic quantum field theory, it is applicable to all particles and fields.

Origins and derivation of the equation 

The  was first established by Paul Dirac in 1928 under the form , where V is the amount of potential energy. 

The equation can be derived in a number of ways, two of the simplest include:

 From the relativistic dynamics of a massive particle,
 By evaluating the norm of the four-momentum of the system.

Heuristic approach for massive particles

For a massive object moving at three-velocity  with magnitude  in the lab frame:

is the total energy of the moving object in the lab frame,

is the three dimensional relativistic momentum of the object in the lab frame with magnitude . The relativistic energy  and momentum  include the Lorentz factor defined by:

Some authors use relativistic mass defined by:

although rest mass  has a more fundamental significance, and will be used primarily over relativistic mass  in this article.

Squaring the 3-momentum gives:
 

Inserting this form of the Lorentz factor into the energy equation gives:

followed by more rearrangement it yields. This approach is not general as massless particles are not considered.

Norm of the four-momentum

Special relativity

In Minkowski space, energy (divided by ) and momentum are two components of a Minkowski four-vector, namely the four-momentum;

(these are the contravariant components).

The Minkowski inner product  of this vector with itself gives the square of the norm of this vector, it is proportional to the square of the rest mass  of the body:

a Lorentz invariant quantity, and therefore independent of the frame of reference. Using the Minkowski metric  with metric signature , the inner product is

and

so

or, in natural units where  = 1,
.

General relativity

In general relativity, the 4-momentum is a four-vector defined in a local coordinate frame, although by definition the inner product is similar to that of special relativity,

in which the Minkowski metric  is replaced by the metric tensor field :

solved from the Einstein field equations. Then:

Performing the summations over indices followed by collecting "time-like", "spacetime-like", and "space-like" terms gives:

where the factor of 2 arises because the metric is a symmetric tensor, and the convention of Latin indices  taking space-like values 1, 2, 3 is used. As each component of the metric has space and time dependence in general; this is significantly more complicated than the formula quoted at the beginning, see metric tensor (general relativity) for more information.

Units of energy, mass and momentum

In natural units where , the energy–momentum equation reduces to

In particle physics, energy is typically given in units of electron volts (eV), momentum in units of eV·−1, and mass in units of eV·−2. In electromagnetism, and because of relativistic invariance, it is useful to have the electric field  and the magnetic field  in the same unit (Gauss), using the cgs (Gaussian) system of units, where energy is given in units of erg, mass in grams (g), and momentum in g·cm·s−1.

Energy may also in theory be expressed in units of grams, though in practice it requires a large amount of energy to be equivalent to masses in this range. For example, the first atomic bomb liberated about 1 gram of heat, and the largest thermonuclear bombs have generated a kilogram or more of heat. Energies of thermonuclear bombs are usually given in tens of kilotons and megatons referring to the energy liberated by exploding that amount of trinitrotoluene (TNT).

Special cases

Centre-of-momentum frame (one particle)

For a body in its rest frame, the momentum is zero, so the equation simplifies to

where  is the rest mass of the body.

Massless particles

If the object is massless, as is the case for a photon, then the equation reduces to

This is a useful simplification. It can be rewritten in other ways using the de Broglie relations:

if the wavelength  or wavenumber  are given.

Correspondence principle

Rewriting the relation for massive particles as:

and expanding into power series by the binomial theorem (or a Taylor series):

or

where the second term is the classical kinetic energy, and the first is the rest energy of the particle. This approximation is not valid for massless particles, since the expansion required the division of momentum by mass. Incidentally, there are no massless particles in classical mechanics.

Many-particle systems

Addition of four momenta

In the case of many particles with relativistic momenta  and energy , where  (up to the total number of particles) simply labels the particles, as measured in a particular frame, the four-momenta in this frame can be added;

and then take the norm; to obtain the relation for a many particle system:

where  is the invariant mass of the whole system, and is not equal to the sum of the rest masses of the particles unless all particles are at rest (see mass in special relativity for more detail).

The energies and momenta in the equation are all frame-dependent, while  is frame-independent.

Center-of-momentum frame

In the center-of-momentum frame (COM frame), by definition we have:

with the implication from  that the invariant mass is also the centre of momentum (COM) mass–energy, aside from the  factor:

and this is true for all frames since  is frame-independent. The energies  are those in the COM frame, not the lab frame. However, many familiar bound systems have the lab frame as COM frame, since the system itself is not in motion and so the momenta all cancel to zero. An example would be a simple object (where vibrational momenta of atoms cancel) or a container of gas where the container is at rest. In such systems, all the energies of the system are measured as mass. For example the heat in an object on a scale, or the total of kinetic energies in a container of gas on the scale, all are measured by the scale as the mass of the system.

Rest masses and the invariant mass

Either the energies or momenta of the particles, as measured in some frame, can be eliminated using the energy momentum relation for each particle:

allowing  to be expressed in terms of the energies and rest masses, or momenta and rest masses. In a particular frame, the squares of sums can be rewritten as sums of squares (and products):

so substituting the sums, we can introduce their rest masses  in :

The energies can be eliminated by:

similarly the momenta can be eliminated by:

Rearranging:

Since the invariant mass of the system and the rest masses of each particle are frame-independent, the right hand side is also an invariant (even though the energies and momenta are all measured in a particular frame).

Matter waves

Using the de Broglie relations for energy and momentum for matter waves,

and tidying up by dividing by  throughout:

This can also be derived from the magnitude of the four-wavevector

in a similar way to the four-momentum above.

Since the reduced Planck constant  and the speed of light  both appear and clutter this equation, this is where natural units are especially helpful. Normalizing them so that , we have:

Tachyon and exotic matter

The velocity of a bradyon with the relativistic energy–momentum relation

can never exceed .

By contrast, the hypothetical exotic matter has a negative mass  and the energy–momentum equation is

See also

 Mass–energy equivalence
 Four-momentum
 Mass in special relativity

References

 
 
 
 

Momentum
Special relativity